There are many variations of the simple rules of Go. Some are ancient digressions, while other are modern deviations. They are often side events at tournaments, for example, the U.S. Go Congress holds a "Crazy Go" event every year.

National variants
The difficulty in defining the rules of Go has led to the creation of many subtly different rulesets. They vary in areas like scoring method, ko, suicide, handicap placement, and how neutral points are dealt with at the end. These differences are usually small enough to maintain the character and strategy of the game, and are typically not considered variants. Different rulesets are explained in Rules of Go.

In some of the examples below, the effects of rule differences on actual play are minor, but the tactical consequences are substantial.

Tibetan Go

Tibetan Go is played on a 17×17 board, and starts with six stones (called Bo) from each color placed on the third line as shown. White makes the first move. There is a unique ko rule: a stone may not be played at an intersection where the opponent has just removed a stone. This ko rule is so different from other major rulesets that it alone significantly changes the character of the game.  For instance, snapbacks must be delayed by at least one move, allowing an opponent the chance to create life.  Finally, a player who occupies or surrounds all four corner points (the 1-1 points) receives a bonus of 40 points, plus another 10 if the player also controls the center point.

Sunjang baduk

Sunjang baduk is a different form of Go (baduk) that evolved in Korea, which dates to the 16th century. Its most distinctive feature is the prescribed opening. The starting position dictates the placement of 16 stones (8 black, 8 white) as shown, and the first move is prescribed for Black at the center of the board. At the end of the game, stones inside friendly territory, which are irrelevant to boundary definition, are removed before counting territory.

It became obscure in the 1950s when it was largely replaced by modern go due to Japanese influence. There are around 45 surviving game records of Sunjang baduk, mostly from the 1880s. The oldest known game record was published in the Chosun Ilbo newspaper in March 1937, although the game was played much earlier. The game is between No Sa-ch'o and Ch'ae Keuk-mun.

Classical Chinese go was played with the diagonal placement of two black stones and two white stones on the four star points in the corners. It is likely that Koreans played go in this form until it developed into Sunjang baduk in the 16th century. In the early 20th century, the top ten strongest players ranged from about 4 dan amateur to 2 dan professional in terms of strength.  From 1910 to 1945, Korea was a Japanese colony. The similarity between Sunjang Baduk and modern go as well as Japanese influence encouraged players to switch to the modern game. The strength and fame of visiting Japanese professional go players encouraged Koreans to abandon Sunjang baduk. This was supported by the father of modern Korean go, Cho Nam-ch'eol, who established close links to Japan by studying go there.

Bangneki
In another Korean variant, bangneki, the players wager on the outcome of the game. A fixed stake ("bang") is paid for every ten points on the board by which the loser is beaten.

Batoo

Batoo is a modern Korean variant. The name stems from a combination of the Korean words baduk and juntoo (“battle”). It is played entirely in cyberspace, and differs from standard Go in a number of ways, most noticeably in the way in which certain areas of the board are worth different points values. The other principal difference is that both players place three stones before the game begins, and may also place a special “hidden stone”, which affects the board as a regular stone but is invisible to the opponent. Batoo became a short-lived fad among young people in Korea around 2011.

Variants altering the rules of play

First Capture

The first player to capture a stone wins. It was invented by Japanese professional Yasutoshi Yasuda, who describes it in his book Go As Communication. Yasuda was inspired by the need for a medium to address the problem of bullying in Japan, but soon found that "First Capture" also works as an activity for senior citizens and even developmentally delayed individuals. He sees it as a game in its own right, not just as a prelude to Go, but also as a way to introduce simple concepts that lead to Go. For the latter purpose, he recommends progressing to "Most Capture", in which the player capturing the most stones wins. This variation is often called Atari Go in the West, where it is becoming increasingly popular as a preliminary means of introducing Go itself to beginners, since, afterward, it is natural to introduce the idea of capturing territory, not just the opponent's stones.

Miai-Go
In Miai-Go, each player plays two moves at once, and their opponent decides which of the two should stay on the board.

Stoical Go
In Stoical Go, invented by abstract game designer Luis Bolaños Mures, standard ko rules don't apply. Instead, it's illegal to make a capture if your opponent made a capture on the previous move. All other rules are the same as in Go. Suicide of one or more stones is not allowed, and area scoring is used.

All known forced Go cycles are impossible with this rule. The nature of the rule itself suggests that forced cycles are either impossible or astronomically rarer than they are in Go when the superko rule is not used.

Ko fights proceed in a similar manner to those of Go, with the difference that captures and moves answered by captures aren't valid ko threats. Although snapbacks are not possible in the basic variant (as it is necessary to make a ko threat before any consecutive capture occurs), they can be explicitly allowed with an extra rule while retaining the property that all known forced cycles are impossible.

Environmental Go
Environmental Go, also called Coupon Go,  invented by Elwyn Berlekamp, adds an element of mathematical precision to the game by compelling players to make quantitative decisions. In effect, the players participate in a downward auction for the number of points they think  is worth at each stage in the game.

The professional players Jiang Zhujiu and Rui Naiwei played the first Environmental Go game in April 1998. Since then the variant has seen little activity on the international scene.

Cards Go
In Cards Go players draw from a pack of cards contain instructions to play one of a fixed set of commonly occurring shapes. If the said shape cannot be placed on the board, then an illegal move is deemed to have been played, which necessitates resignation.

Multi-player Go

In Multi-player Go, stones of different colors are used so that three or more players can play together. The rules must be somewhat altered to create balance in power, as those who play first (especially the first four, on a four-cornered board) have significant advantage.

There are various optional rules that enable cooperation between the players, e.g. division of captured stones among neighbors, or forming alliances for adding up territory points.
A variant called parallel multiplayer go also exists, where the moves are announced simultaneously. If two moves overlap, they count as passes.

Paper and Pencil Go
Paper and Pencil Go is a Go variant that can be played with just paper and pencil. Unlike standard Go, games played under these rules are guaranteed to end in a finite number of moves, and no ko rule is needed. Nothing is ever rubbed out.  It differs from standard Go in the following ways:
 Surrounded stones are not captured, but just marked. Points occupied by marked stones count as territory for the surrounding player, but neither player can play on them for the remainder of the game. This implies that any group which touches a marked stone is unconditionally alive.
 Suicide is allowed, i.e., you can make a play such that one or more of your own stones become marked. 
 Area scoring is used.

(Conventional Go can also be played on paper by drawing circles of different colors.  Captured stones are marked with a line.  Then if the square is replayed, a smaller circle is placed inside the larger circle.)

Omino Go
Also named Tetromino Go. Devised by R. Wayne Schmittberger, each player is allowed to play up to four stones in a turn, provided they are solidly connected on adjacent points. (There are five four-stone patterns possible, two three-stone patterns, and one two-stone pattern, ignoring rotations and reflections.) There is no komi; Black is restricted on their first turn to playing no more than two stones. The winner is determined by Chinese scoring: occupied and surrounded points each count 1 point; captured stones do not have point value. The inventor suggests a 15×15 square-celled board using square-tiled pieces.

Quantum Go
Quantum Go is a Go variant which provides a straightforward illustration of interesting quantum phenomena. Players alternatively play pairs of go stones which are entangled, in the sense that each entangled pair of stones will reduce to a single go stone at some point in the game. A process of quantum-like collapse occurs when a stone is played in contact with one of the stones in an entangled pair.

Block Go
Block Go was a variant of Go played at the 20th Annual Computer Olympiad in which tetris pieces are utilized instead of go stones.

Two Stone Go 
All standard rules apply, but after the Black (the first player) places one stone on the very first move both players place two stones each subsequent turn (similar to the game of Connect6). Since each player has an alternating one stone advantage at the end of their respective turns, there is no strong need for Komidashi (compensation for playing second) in games between even-strength players.

Borderless Go 
In this variant, intersections at the opposite sides of the board are considered adjacent, like on a torus. Therefore, the playing board has no corners or sides and standard opening strategies that focus on capturing those parts of the board do not apply.

Sygo 

Sygo is a two player abstract strategy game invented in 2010 by Christian Freeling. It differs from Go by using a move protocol from Symple, another of Christian Freeling's games, and "othelloanian capture" where stones change colors when captured instead of being removed from the board. The goal of Sygo is to control the most territory on the board as determined by the number of a player's stones on the board as well as the empty points completely surrounded by the players stones. The game ends when one player either resigns or both players pass on successive turns.

Coin Go 

In Coin Go, a stone cannot be played on certain intersections of the board by either player. A coin may be placed on these intersections as a visual aid. Stones adjacent to a coin do not have a liberty at the coin.

There are different ways to determine intersections occupied by coins:

 Intersections are chosen (randomly or not) at the beginning of the game before either player takes a turn. A possible alternative is players take turns placing coins on the board.
 An even number of coins is split between both players. The game begins with no coins on the board. Players may use a turn to place a coin on the board. A possible alternative is to allow spending a coin to remove a coin from the board.
 (The two methods above may also be combined)
Coins may not be captured through liberty shortage. For scoring, coins do not contribute to territory. Normal scoring rules apply.

Since playing as Black might have the potential of being a significant advantage in this variant, players may use the "Pie rule" to determine who plays which color:

 Player A plays Black's first move.
 Player B decides whether to be Black or White for the remainder of the game.

Variants for more than two players, but not altering the mechanism of the game

Pair Go

Outline 
Pair Go is a competitive game played by two pairs, with each team consisting of a male and a female, sharing a single Go board. The pairs play alternately: first, the female player of the two holding black; next, the female player of the pair holding white; next, the male player of the pair holding black; and next, the male player of the pair holding white. 
The word “Pair Go” is the registered trademark of the public interest incorporated foundation Japan Pair Go Association in many countries.
The environment for the event should be pleasant and higher than the usual standard, as should the standard of dress (jacket and tie recommended for the men). In order to encourage good dress, a Best Dressed prize is traditionally awarded (i.e. Best Dresser Award) at all Pair Go events held by IAPGC.

Rules 
The official rules of Pair Go, as determined by the Japan Pair Go Association, are given below. The rules are available in five languages: Japanese, English, Chinese, Korean, and Spanish. Also, the rules were decided in 1991, the year after the game's invention, and their drafting was supervised by Yoshikuni Ichiro, Honorary President of the Japan Pair Go Association, who also served as director of the Cabinet Legislation Bureau. 
A male player and a female player form a pair; the members of the pair sit on the same side of the Go board. Players of the same gender face each other over the board.
The male and female players play alternately. The first move is made by the female member of the pair taking black; next, the female member of the pair taking white plays; next, the male member of the pair with black plays; next, the male member of the pair with white plays. This rotation continues throughout the game.
The members of a pair must not consult each other or give advice. Conversation is permitted only for deciding to resign or to check whose turn it is to play.
In consulting the partner about resigning, the player whose turn it is asks their partner, who must reply only yes or no.
When a mistake is made in the order of players, an objection can be made only about the move just played. When a rotation error has been made, a move cannot be replayed. A penalty of three points is levied on the pair that made the mistake.
If it is confirmed that partners have made an illegal exchange of information, the pair concerned forfeits the game.
When passes are made in succession, the game concludes.
When handicap games are played in tournaments for amateurs, the ranks of the two players in a pair are added, then divided by two to calculate the “pair points.” The handicap is decided by the difference from the pair points of the other pair.

Invention 
Pair Go is a new mind sport born in Japan that was invented in 1990 by Hisao Taki, who was the president of NKB inc. as a means of increasing female and children participation in the game. It was popularised by the Japan Pair Go Association by hosting tournaments including the International Amateur Pair Go Championship started in 1990. They hoped that this increase in itself would add a new appeal to the game.

Tournaments 
IAPGC first introduced Pair Go to Europe in 1992 at European Congress in Canterbury, England. The first European Pair Go Championship (EPGC) was held in Amsterdam in 1995. Since 1997 it has been a regular event, hosted by a different country each year. So far it has been in France, Netherlands, Czechia, Bosnia, Poland, Romania, UK, Germany and Russia. Typically teams from about 15 countries take part. Since 2004 they have been competing for points, as well as prizes, to allow their country to qualify for the IAPGC. There is also a popular Pair Go event at the annual European Go Congress.
Amateur Pair Go tournaments have been held in the United States at the U.S. Go Congresses since 2005 at least  and in Denver, Colorado. In the US, more than eighty players participate in the North American Pair Go Championship at the US Go Congress every year. With the support of the World Pair Go Association, the AGA is expanding the presence of Pair Go in the US with a series of sponsored regional tournaments, culminating in an internet playoff for free tickets to the US Go Congress for the North American Pair Go Championship.
The tournament that determines the world's number one amateur pair each year is the International Amateur Pair Go Championship, which was founded in 1990. A Japanese Pair Go tournament in which top male and female professionals from the Nihon Ki-in and the Kansai Ki-in compete, the Professional Pair Go Championship, was founded in 1994. In 2008, Pair Go became an official sport at the Mind Sports tournament. In 2010, it was included in the Guangzhou Asian Games; in 2011, it was an official sport at the SportAccord World Mind Games, which is recognized by the IOC. The following international professional tournaments have been held: the Pair Go World Cup 2010 in Huangzhou, China; the Pair Go World Cup 2016 Tokyo; the Pair Go World Championship was held each year from 2017 to 2019.
In 2019, an international tournament was held to commemorate the 30th anniversary of the birth of Pair Go. At present, the game is played in 75 countries and territories (as of September 2020). 
The Pair Go World Cup 2022 Japan, in which the world's top professional and amateur players competed, took place from March 17 to March 21, 2022, in Tokyo. Ratings determined by the rating system on the Internet Go salon Pandanet will be used as the unified basis for the rankings of all the players taking part. The handicaps will be decided by the “pair points” calculated on the basis of the rankings determined by this rating system. Ratings in Go differ in different parts of the world, meaning that there are often big differences in strength among players of the same nominal ranks, so the lack of a unified rating system has been a problem. Since the games in the Official Pair Go Handicap Tournament will use ratings determined by a unified system, so it will be possible to eliminate these differences and calculate the correct handicaps. For this reason, it is expected that this tournament will have an epoch-making effect on the popularization of Pair Go.

Olympics 
The international popularization of Pair Go has made big strides. In 2008, the World Pair Go Association (WPGA) was founded with the aim of further popularizing and developing Pair Go. As of September 2020, the association had 75 countries and territories affiliated with it. Matsuura Koichiro, the 8th Director General of UNESCO, serves as president. Also, the committee to Make Pair Go an Olympic Sport was launched on June 30, 2015. In October 2019, the Japan Go Federation, an incorporated foundation, was founded by the Japan Pair Go Association in cooperation with the Nihon Ki-in and the Kansai Ki-in; it is the only body that represents the Japanese Go world internationally. It also is carrying out activity to secure the adoption of Go and Pair Go as Olympic sports in the future.

Rengo
Rengo, which is the origin of Pair Go, is a more general form of Pair Go where players can be of any gender. Each player in the team must play in turn, playing out of sequence will normally result in a small penalty (usually three prisoners). Partners may not consult on how to play, or engage in any form of signaling. Communication between partners may only take the following forms listed below.
 May we resign? can be answered with yes or no
 How much time is left? can be answered.
 Whose turn is it?

Variants requiring memory of the position

Blind Go
One (as a handicap) or both of the players cannot see the board in this variant. Therefore, they have to remember the whole position. This is considered much more difficult than playing blindfold chess. A few club standard players can play blindfold chess, but only professional players are able to complete a game of blind 19×19 Go.

One Color Go
The two players use stones of the same color. This variation is regarded as a useful tool for developing one's memory and reading skills by forcing both players to remember who placed each stone. An external program or a third person may be used to keep track of who captures what in case one or both players forget the true color of a stone.

Variants with limited knowledge of the position
These variants are not purely strategic games, as the element of luck is quite important.

Shadow Go
This game requires two players, a referee and three playing sets. Each player sees only their own board, while the referee can see them both and also has his/her own set. This variant is usually played on a 9×9 board. Players place stones on their boards, with no knowledge of what other players are doing. A referee keeps track of the game on the central board. If any player makes an illegal move, the referee informs them about it (some play that the referee says only that the move is illegal, while some, that the player is told whether the intersection is occupied or there is illegal ko capture). The player is allowed to make another move.

Rengo Kriegspiel
This is a crossover between rengo and shadow Go. There are two teams with two players each, a referee and five Go sets. The players move alternatingly as in rengo. Each player keeps track of their own moves on their own board; they are not informed about teammates' or opponents' moves. The referee keeps track of the complete game and informs a player if their move was illegal, in which case they can try again. The referee removes captured stones from all affected boards.

Non-standard boards
Although Go is most commonly played on a board with 19×19 lines, 9×9 and 13×13 boards are also available. They are used by beginners and by players who want a game that finishes more quickly. Due to flexibility of configuration, the two smaller sizes are more often played on the online Go servers such as KGS Go Server, and board sizes from 2×2 to 38×38 are also allowed.

The annual Milton Keynes Go Tournament has a popular side-event that is played on a stylised map of Milton Keynes. Its non-conventional lattice presents some interesting possibilities.

Harald Schwarz invented a Go variant that is played on a circular lattice.

Toroidal is played on a two-dimensional doughnut shaped surface. It can be played on a computer app or simulated on a standard board, but requires imagination on the part of the players to perform an abstract join at the edges. Tactics become more elegant without the need for special border and corner cases (joseki) since a toroidal board has only "middle" space.

TriGo uses a triangular-grid goban, where each stone has up to six liberties. To compensate for this, there are several rule changes: ko and superko are limited in scope, komi is not used, and after the first stone is placed, every turn consists of placing two stones. After both players have passed a turn, the score is counted (the sum of captured stones and territory), and in the case of a draw the player passing first wins.

TriPlan, for three players, uses a triangular grid, where each stone has up to six liberties.  Stones can be captured in two ways.  If one player's stones are surrounded by those of one opponent, the surrounding player captures them and counts them as points at the end of the game.  If one player's stones are surrounded by those of both opponents, they must be played as the surrounded player's next turn. If a player resigns, the two other players will determine who continues the game against the other two. That player will play alone, aiming to achieve a higher minimum score at the end of the game. At the end all captured stones and all stones on the board are counted. If the player reach his achieved goal, he wins. If the lone player doesn't reach the goal, the other two win the game. If there were no resignations, the player with the most points wins.

Hexagonal Go, like hexagonal chess, played on boards composed of hexagon cells, where each stone has up to six liberties.

Other 2D variants can also be performed with edges joined in three other ways, resulting in a topological sphere, Klein bottle or real projective plane.  Multiple boards can be used to form other Riemann surfaces.

Other than 2D 

Alak is a Go-like game restricted to a single spatial dimension.
Go can be extended to three dimensions. One example is Diamond Go, which uses the structure of a carbon diamond crystal lattice. With many Go variants, the nature of the game changes dramatically when the standard four connections per point is changed. Diamond Go, however, maintains this connectivity. Another example is Margo, by Cameron Browne, a variant played with marbles that can be stacked on top of one another.

A program called Freed Go can be used to play with boards with generic topology. It has embedded 11 different boards, either three-dimensional shapes (including cube, sphere, cylinder, diamond, torus and Möbius strip) or flat fields with points connected to three, five or six neighboring points, but it's also possible to create custom boards.

See also 

 Abstract strategy game for other board games sometimes compared to Go
 Games played with Go equipment

References

External links 
 The North American pair go circuit
 Go Variants at World of Abstract Games, with sections on Other Rules, Other Boards, Other Pieces, and Other players; well illustrated
 Go Variants, by Andre Engels, text descriptions
 Topological Go, including a mathematical discussion
 Sensei's Go variants on Sensei's Library
 Freed Go, board with generic topology
 World Batoo League

 
Chinese games
Abstract strategy games
Traditional board games
Game variants